The House of Schwarzenberg is a German (Franconian) and Czech (Bohemian) aristocratic family, and it was one of the most prominent European noble houses. The Schwarzenbergs are members of the German nobility and Czech nobility, and they held the rank of Princes of the Holy Roman Empire. The family belongs to the high nobility and traces its roots to the Lords of Seinsheim during the Middle Ages.

The current head of the family is Karel, 12th Prince of Schwarzenberg, a Czech politician who served as Minister of Foreign Affairs of the Czech Republic. The family owns properties and lands across Austria, the Czech Republic, Germany and Switzerland. The family is traditionally based in Bohemia (Czech Republic), where its ancestral seat is.

History

Origin
The family stems from the Lords of Seinsheim, who had established themselves in Franconia during the Middle Ages. A branch of the Seinsheim family (the non-Schwarzenberg portion died out in 1958) was created when Erkinger of Seinsheim acquired the Franconian territory of Schwarzenberg and the castle of Schwarzenberg in Scheinfeld during the early part of the 15th century. He was then granted the title of Freiherr (Baron) of Schwarzenberg in 1429. At that time, the family also possessed some fiefdoms in Bohemia.

Ascent and expansion
In 1599, the Schwarzenbergs were elevated to Imperial Counts, and the family was later raised to princely status in 1670. In 1623 came the Styrian Dominion of Murau into the Schwarzenberg family due to the marriage of Count Georg Ludwig of Schwarzenberg (1586–1646) with Anna Neumann von Wasserleonburg (1535–1623). Furthermore, the House of Schwarzenberg acquired extensive land holdings in Bohemia in 1661 through a marriage alliance with the House of Eggenberg. In the 1670s, the Schwarzenbergs established their primary seat in Bohemia and, until 1918, their main residence was in Český Krumlov, Bohemia (now in Czech Republic).

Schwarzenberg/Sulz family unification
Due to the absence of a male heir and his only daughter Maria Anna married to Prince Ferdinand of Schwarzenberg, Johann Ludwig II Count of Sulz proposed a family unification between the Counts of Sulz and Princes of Schwarzenberg at the Imperial Court. His request was granted, which not only transferred all legal and property rights upon his death in 1687 from the Sulz family to the Schwarzenberg family, but assured that the Sulz family continues in the Schwarzenberg family. The visible affirmation of this bond was the merging of the coat of arms.

Two princely lines 
At the beginning of the 19th century, the House of Schwarzenberg was divided into two princely-titled lines (majorats). This division was already foreseen in the will of Prince Ferdinand (1652-1703). However, the absence of two male heirs until Joseph II and Karl I Philipp inhibited the execution. The senior branch, which held not only the Palais Schwarzenberg in Vienna, but also the Dominions of Scheinfeld, Krumlov, Frauenberg and Murau, died out in the male line in 1979 upon the death of Joseph III of Schwarzenberg, who was the 11th Prince of Schwarzenberg. The cadet branch, which was established by Karl Philipp, Prince of Schwarzenberg at Orlík Castle, continues to the present day.

The two branches have now been re-united under the current head of the family, Karl VII of Schwarzenberg, who is the 12th Prince of Schwarzenberg. He is a Czech politician and served as Minister of Foreign Affairs of the Czech Republic.

Present time
Due to the unification of the family-headship under Karl VII Schwarzenberg, the fidei commissa of both the primogeniture / Hluboka line and the secundogeniture / Orlik line came under the single ownership of the last-mentioned prince. Karl VII created in the 1980s the current structure of the family belongings. The German and Austrian properties from the primogeniture were embedded (with some exceptions) into the Fürstlich Schwarzenberg'sche Familienstiftung (Princely Schwarzenberg Family-Foundation) based in Vaduz. The art collection, which includes the painting The Abduction of Ganymede by Peter Paul Rubens or an important collection of works by Johann Georg de Hamilton, is held in the separate Fürstlich Schwarzenberg'sche Kunststiftung (Princely Schwarzenberg Art-Foundation). The Czech property of the secundogeniture is held privately. The members of the family follow careers in the private or military sector.

Frisian and Prussian line 
Michael II Baron zu Schwarzenberg (†1469), oldest son of Erkinger I (1362–1437), was married twice. First with Gertrud (Bätze) von Cronberg (†1438), from whom the princely line descends. His second marriage was with Ursula (Frankengrüner) Grüner (†~1484), from whom the Frisian and later the Prussian line originates. The children of Michael's and Ursula's alliance were never recognized by their half-siblings, as their first born son was born out of wedlock and the legitimisation only took place with the subsequent wedding.

Johann Onuphrius (1513–1584), a great-grandson of Michael II and Ursula, is considered to be the progenitor of the Frisian Line. His marriage with Maria von Grumbach (†1564) ensured Groot Terhorne Castle until 1879 as the family seat in the Netherlands. The Frisian line was made a member of the Dutch nobility by a Royal decree of King William I of the Netherlands on August 28, 1814. Henceforth, the Dutch version thoe Schwartzenberg en Hohenlansberg was applied for this branch of the family.

The Prussian Line was established as a cadet branch of the Frisian line with Georg Baron thoe Schwartzenberg en Hohenlansberg (1842–1918), who served as a Rittmeister in the Imperial German Army. He and his descendants were made members of the Prussian nobility by an Imperial decree, issued by Emperor Wilhelm II, and are entitled to carry the German title Freiherr.

Imperial immediate estates
The Schwarzenberg family held three Imperial Immediate Estates in the Holy Roman Empire.

By coincidence the coat of arms of the Princely Landgraviate of Klettgau and the Earldom of Buchan in Scotland are the same. The Klettgau coat of arms can be found in the left heart shield of the Schwarzenberg coat of arms.

Notable family members
The House of Schwarzenberg produced many military commanders, politicians, church dignitaries (including a Cardinal), innovators and patrons of the arts. They were related to a number of European aristocratic families, notably the Lobkowicz family. Some of the most noteworthy members of the Schwarzenberg family are:

Property and residences

Germany 
The Schwarzenberg family holding included the following residences in Germany:

Bohemia 
 The Schwarzenberg land holdings in Bohemia included the Duchy of Krumlov, the town of Prachatice and Orlík Castle. The family also acquired the property of the House of Rosenberg. On their lands, the Schwarzenbergs created ponds, planted forests and introduced new technologies in agriculture.

Upon the establishment of the Protectorate of Bohemia and Moravia in 1939, the possessions of Prince Adolph of Schwarzenberg were seized by the Nazi authorities. He managed to flee, but his cousin Heinrich, Duke of Krumlov, was arrested and deported. After World War II, the Czechoslovakian government stated, by law No. 143/1947 from August 13, 1947 (Lex Schwarzenberg), that the assets of the Schwarzenberg-Hluboká primogeniture passed to the Land of Bohemia.

The Schwarzenberg family holding included the following residences in Bohemia:

Austria
The Schwarzenberg family holdings included the following residences in Austria:

Ecclesiastical buildings and places
The following religious places are linked to the Schwarzenberg family either as burial or memorial places:

Monuments and memorials
The following monuments are erected for the Schwarzenberg family and its members:

The Family

Heads of the family and title progression

Dynasty 
The names hereby presented are those of all the direct successors of the Prince John I of Schwarzenberg (1742–1789). They have been respectively divided into the two branches of Krumlov and Orlik, including the contemporary generations. For the genealogy to be easier to consult, the male successors alone are listed, and they are accompanied with noteworthy information where necessary. In bold the names of the members of the eldest part of the family.
 Jan I Nepomuk (1742–1789), 5th Prince of Schwarzenberg, 10th (3rd of his line) Duke of Krumlov 
 A1. Josef II Jan (1769–1833), 6th Prince of Schwarzenberg, 11th (4th of his line) Duke of Krumlov (1789–1833), founder of the main branch of the family (that of Frauenberg-Krummau)
 B1. Jan Adolf II (1799–1888), 7th Prince of Schwarzenberg, 12th (5th of his line) Duke of Krumlov (1833–1888)
 C1. Adolf Josef (1832–1914), 8th Prince of Schwarzenberg, 13th (6th of his line) Duke of Krumlov (1888–1914)
 D1. Jan II Nepomuk (1860–1938), 9th Prince of Schwarzenberg, 14th (7th of his line) Duke of Krumlov (1914–1938)
 E1. Adolph Jan (1890–1950), 10th Prince of Schwarzenberg, 15th (8th of his line) Duke of Krumlov (1938–1950)
 E2. Karl (1892–1919)
 E3. Edmund Černov (1897–1932), Called "Black Sheep" as a consequence of the refusal of his surname
 D2. Alois (1863–1937)
 D3. Felix (1867–1946), Major-General Austro-Hungarian Army
 E1. Josef III (1900–1979), 11th Prince of Schwarzenberg (1950–1979), last member of the eldest side of the dynasty
 E2. Heinrich (1903–1965), 16th (9th of his line) Duke of Krumlov (1950–1965) (adopted G1. Karel (VII/I)) 
 D4. Georg (1867–1952)
 D5. Karel (1871–1902)
 C2. Cajus (1839–1841)
 B2. Felix (1800–1852), Prime Minister of the Austrian Empire
 B3. Friedrich (1809–1885), Archbishop of Prague
 A2. Karel I Philipp (1771–1820), Prince of Schwarzenberg, founder and chief of the second line of the family (Orlík)
 B1. Friedrich (1800–1870), who renounced his right of majorat in favour of his brother
 B2. Karel II (1802–1858)
 C1. Karel III (1824–1904)
 D1. Karel IV (1859–1913)
 E1. Karl V (1886–1914), Major Austro-Hungarian Army in WWI
 F1. Karel VI (1911–1989), Lieutenant Czechoslovak Army, Dr.phil.
 G1.  Karel (VII / I) Schwarzenberg (born 1937), 12th Prince of Schwarzenberg (from 1979), 17th (10th considering his original line) Duke of Krumlov (from 1965), Former Minister of the Foreign Affairs and candidate to the head of state for the Czech Republic in 2013. He unified the two lines of the family.
 H1. Johannes Nepomucenus (born 1967), current CEO of the family companies
 G2. Friedrich (1940–2014), Dr.rer.oec.
 H1. Ferdinand (born 1989), Forbes 30 under 30 (Czech edition, 2019), First Lieutenant Swiss Armed Forces
 F2. Franz (1913–1992), Professor at Loyola University Chicago, Dr.jur.
 G1. Jan (born 1957), Officer of the United States, U.S. Navy Captain, former US Navy Special Operations Officer, Deputy Dir. of US Pacific Command's Joint Interagency Coordination Group for Counter-terrorism and Commander of the Combined Joint Task Force Paladin in Afghanistan
 H1. Alexander (born 1984), United States Armed Forces
 E2. Ernst (1892–1979), Major Czechoslovak Army
 E3. Josef (1894–1894)
 E4. Johann von Nepomuk (1903–1978), Austrian Ambassador, Dr.jur.utr.
 F1. Erkinger (born 1933), Dr. phil., archaeologist
 G1. Johannes (born 1963), Dr.rer.nat., Dr.med.univ.
 G2. Alexander (born 1971),
 H1. Karl Philipp (born 2003)
 D2. Friedrich (1862–1936)
 B2. Leopold (1803–1873), Austrian Marshal

Family tree: secundogeniture

Titles

Titles of the members of the family 

The title of the head of the princely family is:
 HSH The Prince of Schwarzenberg, Duke of Krumlov, Count of Sulz, Princely Landgrave of Klettgau
()

The title of the wife of the head of the family would be:
 HSH The Princess of Schwarzenberg, Duchess of Krumlov, Countess of Sulz, Princely Landgravine of Klettgau
()

The title of the first born son and heir of the family is:
 HSH The Hereditary Prince of Schwarzenberg, Duke of Krumlov, Count of Sulz, Landgrave of Klettgau
()

The title of the wife of the first born son and heir of the family would be:
 HSH The Hereditary Princess of Schwarzenberg, Duchess of Krumlov, Countess of Sulz, Landgravine of Klettgau
()

The title of all other female members of the family is:
 HSH Princess Name of Schwarzenberg, Countess of Sulz, Landgravine of Klettgau
()

The title of all other male members of the family is:
 HSH Prince Name of Schwarzenberg, Count of Sulz, Landgrave of Klettgau
()

Although the family is entitled to use the von und zu, only the zu is applied. Moreover, all members of the family are allowed to use the title Fürst / Fürstin. However, this is not anymore practiced since the late 19th century and the cognates refer to themselves as Prinz / Prinzessin.

Title progression 
  Baron of the Holy Roman EmpirePreßburg 10.8.1429
 Imperial CountPrague 5.6.1599
 Landsmannschaft in Steiermark6.4.1647
 Bohemian InkolatRegensburg 25.4.1654
 Hungarian Indigenat1659
 Princes of the Holy Roman EmpireVienna 14.7.1670
 Grand PalatinateVienna 20.10.1671
 Members of the Imperial DietVienna 22.8.1671
 Members of the Imperial Diet of Counts in Westphalia13.4.1674
 Members of the Higher Nobility (Alter Herrenstand) in Lower AustriaVienna 11.2.1694
 Members of the Imperial Diet of Swabian Princes30.11.1696
 Endowment of two majorats20.10.1703
 Rise to Dukes of Krumlov1719
 Bohemian Duke (of Krumlov)Prague 25.9.1723
 Bohemian Princes (Fürst) for all family membersVienna 5.12.1746
 Princes of the Holy Roman Empire (Reichsfürst) for all family membersVienna 8.12.1746

Coat of arms

Family coat of arms 

The ancestral arms of the Lords of Seinsheim consisted of six vertical stripes in silver and blue. However, the Schwarzenberg family's original coat of arms has four silver and four blue vertical stripes. Moreover, it starts with silver on the heraldic right (mirror-inverted perspective).

The family became Freiherren (Barons) of Schwarzenberg in 1429, and a silver tower on a black hill was added to their coat of arms to represent the city Scheinfeld and Schwarzenberg Castle.

In 1599, Adolf von Schwarzenberg became an Imperial Count, and was given by the emperor a quarter with a canting arms showing the head of a Turk being pecked by a raven. This was to commemorate Adolf's conquest on 19 March 1598 of the Turkish-held fortress and city Győr. The German name of the Hungarian town is Raab, which means raven.

In 1670, the Schwarzenbergs were raised to princely status. However, only the marriage of Ferdinand, The 2nd Prince of Schwarzenberg (1652–1703) with Marie Anna Countess of Sulz (1653–1698), the daughter of Johann Ludwig II Count of Sulz (1626–1687), led to the augmenting of their coat of arms, with quarters added for the domains of Sulz, Brandis (canting arms: a brand) and the Landgraviate of Klettgau. Due to the absence of a male heir, Count Rudolf requested at the imperial court that the two families should be consolidated. This was granted, which meant for the Schwarzenberg family not only to assume all titles, rights and duties of the Counts of Sulz, but also to inherit all of Rudolf's properties.

The last augmentation of the family coat of arms was granted by the Austrian Emperor Franz II/I, he rewarded Field Marshal Karl I Philipp Prince of Schwarzenberg with the right to bear the three-part arms of the Habsburg family with the addition of an upright standing sword. This unique distinction was granted to commemorate the field marshal's victory in the Battle of the Nations, where he was the Generalissimo of the Sixth Coalition.

The family motto is NIL NISI RECTUM (Nothing but the right thing).

Derivative arms 
Traces of the Schwarzenberg family's coat of arms can be found in various district and municipal coats of arms, which can be linked to the family.

Germany

Czech Republic

Switzerland

References

External links

 
 Family history and pictorial family tree
 The Schwarzenberg coat of arms
 Heraldry of the House of Schwarzenberg
 Description of the arms of the Princes of Schwarzenberg (Orlik branch) (in German)

1789 disestablishments
States and territories established in 1347
 
Franconian Circle
German noble families
Barons of the Holy Roman Empire
Czech noble families